FC Akademiya Futbola Rostov-on-Don was a Russian football team based in Rostov-on-Don. It was the senior team for the football academy founded in 2006 by Ivan Savvidis. The senior team participated in the Rostov Oblast amateur championship from 2012.  In 2008 it was named after former USSR international Viktor Ponedelnik.

For 2017–18 season, it received the license for the third-tier Russian Professional Football League. During the winter break in the 2018–19 season, it experienced financial difficulties and dropped out of PFL.

References

External links
  Official site

Association football clubs established in 2012
Association football clubs disestablished in 2019
Defunct football clubs in Russia
Sport in Rostov-on-Don
2012 establishments in Russia
2019 disestablishments in Russia